Mohammad Farokhmanesh  (born 1971 in Shiraz) is a Gerd Ruge-Prize winning Iranian film director, scriptwriter and producer, residing in Germany.

Career

Mohammad Farokhmanesh, born 1971 in Shiraz, (Iran) started making his first short films during his education at the “Iranian Young Cinema Society”. In the years 1995-2001 he gained a University Degree in filmmaking at the Hochschule für bildende Künste (University of Fine Arts Hamburg), after the completion of which he worked two years as a film production consultant.

In 2000, he started his own company brave new work film productions GmbH with his partners Frank Geiger and Armin Hofmann. brave new work is located in Hamburg and has a local branch in Munich.

As a director and producer he realized more than 20 documentaries, feature- and short films. 2004 he received the “Gerd-Ruge-Award” for his debut feature EMPIRE OF EVIL. The documentary was nominated for the “First Appearance Award” (International Film Festival Amsterdam, IDFA), and for the “Golden Key” (Kasseler Dokumentarfilm- & Videofest). The film also won the award “Best Documentary” at the DaKINO International Film Festival (Bucharest). He was a member of the panel for the Human-Rights-Film-Award in 2008, and is an active member of the “Arbeitsgemeinschaft Dokumentarfilm” (AG DOK). brave new work is located in Hamburg and has a local branch in Munich.

Current projects are the feature documentary Little Aryans (2015) and Made in Islam (2015).

Other activities

Due to his personal background and his co-operation with many Iranian artists within his work, he is regarded as a representative of the Iranians in Germany. In this position he often appeared in television, radio and print-media as a referee in topics of Iranian culture and politics.

Filmography

 City of Sounds (2014/15)
Documentary, Producer

 Made in Islam (2017)Documentary, Producer

 The Mamba  (2014)
Comedy, Line producer, Producer

 45 Minutes to Ramallah  (2012)
Comedy, Producer

 Kick in Iran (2009)
Documentary, Producer

 EMPIRE OF EVIL (2007/08)
Documentary, Director/Producer

 COLORS OF MEMORY (2007),
Drama, Co-Writer/Producer

 GORDIAN TROELLER REVISITED (2007)
TV-Documentary, Line Producer

 37 WITHOUT ONIONS (2006)
Short, Comedy, Producer

 STRIP MIND(2006)
Thriller, Producer

 OFFSIDE (2004),
Drama, Line Producer

 AGUJERO(2004)
Short film, Producer

 ROADKILL(2001)
Short film, Director/Producer

Awards

2008: Best Documentary, Bucharest International Filmfestival 2008 ("Empire of Evil")

2007: Gerd Ruge Development Award ("Empire of Evil")

Sources
 https://web.archive.org/web/20090324053542/http://www.bravenewwork.de/team.php?lang=de
 http://www.reichdesboesen.de/mohammad_farokhmanesh.php
 http://www.moviepilot.de/news/mohammad-farokhmanesh-ueber-sein-reich-des-boesen-101679
 http://www.dradio.de/dkultur/sendungen/thema/983390/
 http://agdok.de/-/mitglied/39098
 http://www.news.de/politik/838734695/unterdrueckung-staerkt-den-einfluss-des-westens/1/

Notes

See also
Iranian cinema

External links
 Interview with Mohammad Farokhmanesh, Radio Zamaneh

Iranian film directors
Iranian documentary filmmakers
Iranian screenwriters
Iranian expatriates in Germany
People from Shiraz
1971 births
Living people